Todd Woodbridge and Mark Woodforde were the defending champions, but lost in the quarterfinals to tournament runners-up Scott Davis and Todd Martin.

Mark Knowles and Daniel Nestor won the title by defeating Scott Davis and Todd Martin 6–4, 6–4 in the final.

Seeds
The first four seeds received a bye to the second round.

Draw

Finals

Top half

Bottom half

References

External links
 Official results archive (ATP)
 Official results archive (ITF)

Atlanta Open (tennis)
1995 ATP Tour